For the TV Show by Ramanand Sagar watch Luv Kush

Lav Kush is a 1997 Indian Hindi-language Hindu mythological film, produced by Dilip Kanikaria under the Devyank Arts banner and directed by V. Madhusudhana Rao. It stars Jeetendra, Jaya Prada and music composed by Raamlaxman. The film is based on Valmiki's Uttar Ramayan from the Epic Ramayana, various films and serials have been made with this concept in almost all Indian languages, since 1950 to 2011.

Plot
The film begins with Lord Rama returning to Ayodhya after defeating Ravana along with Goddess Sita and being crowned as the emperor, settling down to a harmonious lifestyle. At that point, his spies inform him that his reputation may be at stake as Sita had spent over a year in Ravana's Lanka. So, he dictates Lakshmana to ensure that Sita is sent to exile. A devastated, pregnant, and distraught Sita is rescued by Valmiki, who shelters her at his ashram by renaming her Lokapavni, where she gives birth to twin sons Lava- Kusha. Valmiki trains them as jake of all trades including knowledge, warfare, and religion.

Ten years later, the twins decide to visit a drought and famine-ravaged Ayodhya to get the blessings of Srirama & Sita also recite the Ramayan. Whereupon, they get the knowledge that Srirama has ostracized Sita. Later, they back with an aversion and refuses to invoke the Ramayan. Sita fails to endure, and fumes which indicate fright. However, she calms after Lava-Kusa re-chanting the Ramayana. After a while, Vashitha instructs Rama to conduct Aswamedha Yagam for the welfare of the country which is impracticable without a wife. Then, Vashista proclaims it can be feasible with the golden ideal of Sita. Plus, the gold required for it is bestowed by the civilians as an atonement for their sins. Now all the sages and saints are invited to the ritual and news spreads to Valmiki's ashram. At this, Sita is perturbed, suspects Srirama's spirit, and collapses. Accordingly, Valmiki relieves her soul to Ayodhya where she is startled to see golden Sita and Srirama's adoration on her.

Soon after, Valmiki states that the meaning of Rama Avtar is standing on one word, one arrow and love is for only one wife. Herewith, Sita repents and performs a pooja as contrition as per the advice of Valmiki. Meanwhile, Srirama begins the ritual and leaves the horse which the twins obstruct, confronts Lakshman, and defeats the entire Ayodhya army along with him. Being cognizant of it, Srirama proceeds to recoup the horse and an altercation carry out between father & sons which leads to war. Spotting it, Anjineeya hurriedly rushes to Sita and informs her of the catastrophe. Immediately, she impedes the battle and proclaims Lava-Kusha as the progeny of Srirama. Thus, the two embrace their father when everyone requests Sita to be back as queen which she denies and returns to her mother Bhudevi. At last, Rama and his brothers renounce the throne by crowning Lava-Kusha. Finally, the movie ends on a happy note with Rama & Sita merging into their original forms of Vishnu and Lakshmi at Vaikuntha.

Cast
Jeetendra as Lord Rama
Jaya Prada as Goddess Sita 
Arun Govil as Lakshmana
Dara Singh as Lord Hanuman  
Pran as Valmiki
M. Balayya as Vashistha
Tiku Talsania as Prachodi   
Jayshree Gadkar as Kausalya 
Beena Banerjee as Shantaji
Aruna Irani as Goddess Bhudevi
Master Baladitya as Lava
Baby Sreshtha as Kusha

Soundtrack 
The songs were composed by Raam Laxman and penned by Dev Kohli and Bhring Tupkari.

"Barson Ka Hreen Chukane Aayi" - Lata Mangeshkar, S. P. Balasubrahmanyam
"Nanha Munha Aayega Mehmaan" - Asha Bhosle, Usha Mangeshkar 
"Yeh Vidhi Ki Dekho Kaisi Vidambana" - S. P. Balasubrahmanyam

Release

References

External links
 

1997 films
1990s Hindi-language films
Hindu mythological films
Films based on the Ramayana
Films directed by V. Madhusudhana Rao
Films scored by Raamlaxman